Riama colomaromani is a species of lizard in the family Gymnophthalmidae. The species is endemic to Ecuador.

Etymology
The specific name, colomaromani, is in honor of Ecuadorian herpetologist Luis Aurelio Coloma Román.

Geographic range
R. colomaromani is found in Pichincha Province, Ecuador.

Habitat

Reproduction
R. colomaromani is oviparous.

References

Further reading
Doan TM, Castoe TA (2005). "Phylogenetic taxonomy of the Cercosaurini (Squamata: Gymnophthalmidae), with new genera for species of Neusticurus and Proctoporus ". Zoological Journal of the Linnean Society 143: 405–416. (Riama colomaromani, new combination).
Kizirian DA (1996). "A Review of Ecuadorian Proctoporus (Squamata: Gymnophthalmidae) with Descriptions of Nine New Species". Herpetological Monographs 10: 85–155. (Proctoporus colomaromani, new species).
Torres-Carvajal O, Pazmiño-Otamendi G, Salazar-Valenzuela D (2019). "Reptiles of Ecuador: a resource-rich online portal, with dynamic checklists and photographic guides". Amphibian & Reptile Conservation 13 (1) [General Section]: 209–229 (e178).

Riama
Reptiles of Ecuador
Endemic fauna of Ecuador
Reptiles described in 1996
Taxa named by David A. Kizirian